WHLA (90.3 FM) is a radio station licensed to La Crosse, Wisconsin. The station is part of Wisconsin Public Radio (WPR), and airs WPR's "Ideas Network", consisting of news and talk programming.  WHLA also broadcasts regional news and programming from studios in the Whitney Center at the University of Wisconsin-La Crosse.

See also Wisconsin Public Radio

External links
Wisconsin Public Radio

HLA
Wisconsin Public Radio
NPR member stations